The 323rd Air Expeditionary Wing (323 AEW) is a provisional United States Air Force unit assigned to the United States Air Forces in Europe. As a provisional unit, it may be activated or inactivated at any time.

It was last known to be active from 14 March – 30 April 2008 at Câmpia Turzii, Romania, serving briefly as the USAF headquarters for a NATO Summit.

During World War II, the group's predecessor unit, the 323rd Bombardment Group (Medium) was a B-26 Marauder bombardment group assigned to the Eighth and later Ninth Air Force.

History

Air Force Reserve
The wing was first activated as the 323rd Bombardment Wing at Tinker Air Force Base, Oklahoma in June 1949 when Continental Air Command implemented the wing base organization for its reserve units, uniting support organizations and the 323rd Bombardment Group under a single headquarters.

The wing was ordered to active duty on 10 March 1951 as a result of the Korean War. Its personnel and equipment were used as fillers for other units and it was inactivated on 17 March 1951.

323rd Fighter-Bomber Wing
The wing was reactivated at Bunker Hill AFB, Indiana on 8 August 1955 and assigned to Tactical Air Command's Ninth Air Force. Initially training with North American F-86Fs, these were quickly upgraded to the North American F-86H Sabre and then to the North American F-100A/D Super Sabre in 1956 to become proficient in tactical air operations. Operational squadrons were the 453rd Fighter Bomber Squadron (453 FBS), 454th Fighter Bomber Squadron (454 FBS) and 455th Fighter Bomber Squadron (455 FBS).

The wing's aircraft wore a band on the tail and around the nose edged with small black checkers.

In 1955, Strategic Air Command (SAC) began stationing units at the base and the Eighth Air Force claimed jurisdiction of Bunker Hill AFB in September 1957. With the turnover of the base from TAC to SAC, the 323rd was phased down and replaced by SAC's 401st Air Base Group on 1 September 1957.

323rd Flying Training Wing

The 323rd was reactivated as the 323rd Flying Training Wing (323 FTW), an Air Training Command (ATC) undergraduate navigator training (UNT) wing at Mather AFB, California on 1 April 1973, replacing the 3535th Navigator Training Wing which had existed at Mather since 1946. As the sole navigator training wing for the entire Air Force, the 323 FTW also conducted advanced training for newly-winged navigators slated for subsequent as navigator-bombardiers and electronic warfare officers in B-52, FB-111, B-1, EF-111 and RC-135 aircraft as well as weapon systems officers in F-4 Wild Weasel variants. The following operational squadrons were redesignated as a flying training squadrons as result of the 323rd's reactivation: 449th Flying Training Squadron (449 FTS), 450th Flying Training Squadron (450 FTS), 451st Flying Training Squadron (451 FTS), 452nd Flying Training Squadron (452 FTS) and the 432nd Flying Training Squadron (432nd FTS).

The 323 FTW also operated Mather AFB as the "host" wing for the installation while the Strategic Air Command's 320th Bombardment Wing (320 BMW) and the Air Force Reserve's SAC-gained 940th Air Refueling Group (940 ARG), later 940th Air Refueling Wing (940 ARW), were "tenant" wings.  The 323 FTW also had responsibility for publishing Navigator magazine, a USAF-wide professional publication.  The 323 FTW also conducted operational test and evaluation of the T-43A aircraft from 1 August 1973 – 31 October 1973 and began conversion from the T-29 to the T-43 shortly afterwards. As the only USAF flight training school teaching air navigation, the wing served not only the active duty USAF, but also the Air National Guard, the Air Force Reserve and friendly foreign nations.

With the decommissioning of the U.S. Navy's Training Squadron TWENTY-NINE (VT-29) at NAS Corpus Christi, TX in 1975, the 323 FTW also began training U.S. Navy student Naval Flight Officers destined for land-based naval aircraft, NATO/Allied student naval flight officers under U.S. Navy responsibility also destined for land-based maritime aircraft, and U.S. Coast Guard enlisted navigators for that service's HC-130 aircraft starting in July 1976. Instructor Naval Flight Officers, mostly from the Navy's P-3 community, were administratively assigned to Naval Air Training Unit Mather (NAVAIRTU Mather) and embedded in the 323 FTW, teaching USAF, USN and NATO/Allied students.

Support of the Marine Aerial Navigation School (MANS) for U.S. Marine Corps enlisted KC-130 navigators also began in July 1976 when MANS moved from NAS Corpus Christi to Mather AFB. However, MANS conducted its own navigation training independently.

In view of this influx of naval personnel, Naval Air Training Unit Mather (NAVAIRTU Mather) was established in 1976 under the Chief of Naval Air Training (CNATRA). In order to place the Navy organization on par with the 323 FTW commander, a USN Captain or Captain-selectee naval flight officer who had already had been the commanding officer of an operational combat P-3 squadron was placed as the commanding officer of NAVAIRTU Mather, with administrative claimancy over all naval personnel (students, instructors and support staff) assigned to the 323 FTW.

The 323 FTW began training female USAF navigators in March 1977 and female USN naval flight officers in 1981. Female USAF instructor navigators followed in the 1983–84 time frame. In 1986, LT Kathryn P. Hire, USN a former navigator and aircraft mission commander in the RP-3D Orion oceanographic research aircraft, became the first female USN NFO Instructor in the 323 FTW. Of note is that in 1993, then-LCDR Hire would become the first female assigned to the combat version of the P-3C Orion, and as a CDR and CAPT, would become a NASA mission specialist astronaut, flying the STS-90 mission in 1998 and the STS-130 mission in 2010.

On 15 December 1991, the 323rd implemented the objective wing concept and the 449th, 450th, 451st, 452nd and 432nd FTSs were inactivated and the wing was reorganized to a single squadron of aircraft type. All T-43As were assigned to the 445 FTS and T-37Bs to the 455 FTS. On 1 July 1993, following the disestablishment of the Air Training Command, the wing was assigned to the new Air Education and Training Command (AETC).

Under AETC, the T-43 and T-47 aircraft assigned to the 454th and 455th FTSs were assigned tail codes of "NT", but due to the Base Realignment and Closure (BRAC)-directed closure of Mather AFB on 30 September 1993, the 323 FTW was inactivated on 1 October 1993.

With the wing's inactivation, its mission and most of its T-43 aircraft were reassigned to the 12th Flying Training Wing (12 FTW) and the 558th Flying Training Squadron (558 FTS) at Randolph AFB, Texas. Because of the presence of T-37B aircraft at Randolph AFB for T-37 Pilot Instructor Training (PIT), the Mather T-37s were sent to long-term storage at AMARC at Davis–Monthan AFB, Arizona.

Expeditionary operations
The Wing was provisionally activated for a NATO summit at Balotesti in Romania from 14 March to 30 April 2008.

Lineage
 Established as the 323rd Bombardment Wing, Light on 10 May 1949
 Ordered to active duty on 10 March 1951
 Inactivated on 17 March 1951
 Redesignated 323rd Fighter-Bomber Wing on 9 May 1955
 Activated on 8 August 1955
 Inactivated on 1 September 1957
 Redesignated 323rd Flying Training Wing on 28 July 1972
 Activated on 1 April 1973
 Inactivated on 1 October 1993
 Redesignated as 323rd Air Expeditionary Wing and converted to provisional status 25 March 2003
 Activated 14 March 2008
 Inactivated 30 April 2008

Assignments
 Twelfth Air Force, 27 June 1949
 Fourteenth Air Force, 1 July 1950 – 17 March 1951
 Ninth Air Force, 8 August 1955 – 1 September 1957
 Air Training Command, 1 April 1973
 Air Education and Training Command, 1 July – 1 October 1993
 United States Air Forces in Europe 25 March 2003
 Third Air Force, 14 March – 30 April 2008

Components
Groups
 323rd Bombardment Group (later 323rd Fighter-Bomber Group, 323rd Operations Group), 27 June 1949 – 17 March 1951, 8 August 1955 – 1 September 1957, 15 December 1991 – 1 September 1957
 386th Fighter-Bomber Group, 8 April 1956 – 9 April 1957 (Attached)

Squadrons
 449th Flying Training Squadron: 1 April 1973 – 15 December 1991
 450th Flying Training Squadron: 1 April 1973 – 15 December 1991
 451st Flying Training Squadron: 1 April 1973 – 15 December 1991
 452nd Flying Training Squadron: 1 April 1973 – 15 December 1991
 453rd Flying Training Squadron: 1 April 1973 – 15 December 1991
 454th Flying Training Squadron: 1 April 1973 – 15 December 1991
 455th Flying Training Squadron: 1 April 1973 – 15 December 1991

Stations
 Tinker Air Force Base, Oklahoma, 27 June 1949 – 28 March 1951
 Bunker Hill Air Force Base, Indiana, 8 August 1955 – 1 September 1957
 Mather Air Force Base, California, 1 April 1973 – 30 September 1993

Aircraft
 Douglas B-26 Invader (1949–1951)
 North American F-86 Sabre (1955–1957)
 North American F-100 Super Sabre (1956–1957)
 Convair T-29 (1973–1974)
 Boeing T-43 (1973–1993)
 Cessna T-37 Tweet (1973–1993)

References

Citations

Bibliography 

 
 

Military units and formations established in 1949
Air expeditionary wings of the United States Air Force